The term Houtland (Dutch for Wood land) can refer to two regions in the historical Flanders:
 Houtland (France), a region in French Flanders, the French Westhoek
 Houtland (West Flanders), a region in the Belgian province of West Flanders, around Bruges
 a breed of sheep, see Houtland sheep